Laura Anne Stevenson (born April 25, 1984) is an American singer-songwriter from Long Island, New York, and formerly a keyboard player for the musical collective Bomb the Music Industry!

Biography
Stevenson was raised in Nassau County, New York. Her grandfather, Harry Simeone, was a successful pianist and composer whose works included "The Little Drummer Boy" and "Do You Hear What I Hear?". His wife, Margaret McCravy, was a singer for the jazz bandleader Benny Goodman. After leaving home for college, Stevenson began both playing guitar and writing songs.

Growing up in Rockville Centre, Stevenson befriended members of the Arrogant Sons of Bitches. After they disbanded in 2005, she was appointed keyboard player for the lead singer Jeff Rosenstock's new project, Bomb the Music Industry!. At this point, she had written a number of songs and was performing solo. While recording and touring with Bomb the Music Industry!, she began to piece together her own band.

Initially, Stevenson's band consisted primarily of members of Bomb the Music Industry!. In summer 2007, Stevenson met Michael Campbell of the Long Island punk band Latterman who began playing bass guitar in her band. Alex Billig was added on trumpet and accordion, and a year later Stevenson began working on her first studio recording.

Asian Man Records released "A Record" on April 13, 2010, on LP and CD. The group spent more than half of that year on tour in the United States, Canada, the United Kingdom and Western Europe in various line-ups with Bomb the Music Industry!, Maps & Atlases, Cults, among others.

The band officially signed to the New Jersey independent label Don Giovanni Records in November 2010, and their second album, Sit Resist, was released on April 26, 2011.

Stevenson's third full-length album, Wheel, was produced and mixed by Kevin S. McMahon at Marcata Recording. It was released on April 23, 2013, on Don Giovanni Records. Pitchfork Media had previously premiered the first single from the album, "Runner". Stevenson toured the U.S. in April and May in support of the album.

On October 30, 2015 Stevenson released her fourth album Cocksure, on Don Giovanni Records, and the band toured in the United States and Europe in support of the release.

On December 7, 2016, Stevenson released her first live album, recorded at Vera Club and released it via Quote Unquote Records, with 100% of the proceeds being donated to Planned Parenthood.

Stevenson's fifth studio album The Big Freeze was released on March 29, 2019 and debuted on the Billboard charts at #11 Alternative New Artist Albums, #35 for Heatseekers Albums, and #41 for Current Alternative Albums.  Her sixth album, Laura Stevenson, was released on August 6, 2021.

Members of Laura Stevenson's band

Laura Stevenson: guitar/vocals
Mike Campbell: bass guitar
Alex Billig: accordion/trumpet
Peter Naddeo: guitar
Samantha Niss: drums

Discography

Studio albums

Jeff and Laura

Singles, EPs, live releases
Singles, EPs, live releases

References

External links
Official website
Laura Stevenson at Quote Unquote Records
Master Of Art – Laura Stevenson

American women singer-songwriters
Singer-songwriters from New York (state)
American folk singers
1984 births
Living people
American folk rock musicians
Don Giovanni Records artists
21st-century American singers
21st-century American women singers